The 1996 Illawarra Steelers season was the fifteenth in the club's history. They competed in the Australian Rugby League's 1996 Optus Cup season, finishing in 14th place on the ladder, missing out on the finals for the fourth year in a row. The Reserve Grade and President's Cup teams both missed out on their respective Grand Finals by one game, whilst the junior Steelers - the S.G. Ball and Harold Matthew's sides both won their competitions.

Player movements
Gains

Losses

Squad

 (c)

Draw and results

Quick summary

Regular season

March

O'Meara; Wishart, Rodwell, McGregor, Seru; C.Simon, J.White; Fritz, Callaway, England, Cross (c), Richards, Timmins. Cox, Hepi, Bristow.

O'Meara; Wishart, Rodwell, McGregor, Seru; C.Simon, J.White; Fritz, Callaway, Richards, Mackay, Cross (c), Timmins. D.Walsh, Piccinelli, England, Carige.

Reserve Grade: Illawarra Steelers defeated Auckland Warriors 18-12.

April

O'Meara; Wishart, Rodwell, McGregor, Seru; C.Simon, J.White; Fritz, Callaway, Richards, Mackay, Timmins, Cross (c). Carige, Walsh, Doherty, Hepi.

Reserve Grade: Brisbane defeated Illawarra 24-14

Riolo; Wishart, Timmins, McGregor, Seru; Mackay, Air; Fritz, Hepi, Walsh, Cross (c), Doherty, Rodwell. Richards, England, Cox, J.White.

Souths forward Martin Masella was sent-off after 35 minutes for an illegal use of the elbow. Steelers hooker Brad Hepi was cited for a high tackle, but later exonerated.

Reserve Grade: Illawarra defeated Souths 18-2.

Riolo; Wishart, Timmins, Simon, Seru; Mackay, Air; Fritz, Hepi, Walsh, Doherty, Cross (c), Rodwell. Cox, Richards, O'Meara, J.White.

Gold Coast Chargers winger David Baildon was sent-off after 39 minutes for striking and was later sentenced to six weeks on the sideline. The Steelers, however, could not use the extra man advantage in the second-half to win the game. They were able to peg the score back to 16-all early in the second-half, but were unable go on with it. Two tries to the Chargers assured victory for the home team.

Reserve Grade: Illwarra defeated Gold Coast 20-10.

Riolo; Wishart, Timmins, Simon, Seru; Mackay, Air; Fritz, Hepi, Walsh, Doherty, Cross (c), Rodwell. K.White, Richards, O'Meara, Purcell.

The Steelers coughed up a 20-6 lead at half-time with some sloppy handling and disastrous defence to give away 24 unanswered second-half points to the boys that travelled from across the Tasman.

Reserve Grade: Illawarra defeated Auckland 29-10.

May

June

Reserve Grade: Illawarra defeated Canberra 22-16.

July

Ladder

Home crowd averages

References

External links

Illawarra Steelers seasons
Illawarra Steelers season